Alexander Lumsden (October 4, 1843 – 1904) was an Ontario lumber merchant and political figure. He represented the riding of Ottawa in the Legislative Assembly of Ontario from 1898 to 1902 as a Liberal member.

He was born in New Edinburgh, the son of John Lumsden, and educated at the Ottawa Collegiate Institute. He married Margaret Duncan. He worked for lumbermen Joseph Merrill Currier and James MacLaren before going into business on his own in 1881. Lumsden acquired timber limits in  Témiscaming, Québec, Canada region and also owned lumber mills and a fleet of steamships in that region. After his death, his son John took over the operation of the business.

References 
 Canadian Parliamentary Guide, 1901, AJ Magurn

External links 
Member's parliamentary history for the Legislative Assembly of Ontario
A History of the Ottawa Collegiate Institute, 1843-1903 ... (1904)
A cyclopædia of Canadian biography ..., HW Charlesworth (1919) - biography of his son John

1843 births
1904 deaths
Ontario Liberal Party MPPs
Lisgar Collegiate Institute alumni